Onyx on First is a high-rise building located in the United States capital of Washington, D.C. The 260 unit building was developed by the Canyon-Johnson Urban Fund. Demolition of the original buildings in the location began in September 2006 and construction began on October 31, 2006. It was completed in August 2008 and move-in began October 2009.

The building rises , with 14 stories and 4 below-grade parking levels.  The building is an apartment complex with 266 units.

See also
List of tallest buildings in Washington, D.C.

References

External links
Official website

Apartment buildings in Washington, D.C.
Residential skyscrapers in Washington, D.C.
2008 establishments in Washington, D.C.
Residential buildings completed in 2008